Neve Harif is a kibbutz in southern Israel. Located in the Arabah valley near Eilat, it falls under the jurisdiction of Hevel Eilot Regional Council.

History
The kibbutz was founded in 1983 by city dwellers who wanted to establish a kibbutz that would combine the kibbutz ideology with a modern daily lifestyle. The community was established on a temporary site named Shitim, moving to the current site a year later. The kibbutz was originally named Avida based on its location, but was renamed Neve Harif in honour of Knesset member and kibbutz activist Moshe Harif who was killed in a car crash in 1982.

References

External links
Neve Harif Negev Information Centre

Kibbutzim
Kibbutz Movement
Populated places established in 1983
Populated places in Southern District (Israel)
1983 establishments in Israel